Rypobius is a genus of minute hooded beetles in the family Corylophidae. There are about five described species in Rypobius.

Species
These five species belong to the genus Rypobius:
 Rypobius brevicornis Matthews, 1899
 Rypobius fiorianus (Matthews, 1886)
 Rypobius marinus LeConte, 1852
 Rypobius minutus Casey, 1900
 Rypobius praetermissus Bowestead, 1999

References

Further reading

 
 
 

Corylophidae
Articles created by Qbugbot
Coccinelloidea genera